The Last Sunset is a 1961 American Western film directed by Robert Aldrich and starring Rock Hudson, Kirk Douglas, and Dorothy Malone.

The film was released by Universal Pictures and shot in Eastmancolor in Mexico. The screenplay by Dalton Trumbo was adapted from Howard Rigsby's 1957 novel Sundown at Crazy Horse.

The supporting cast features Joseph Cotten, Carol Lynley, Neville Brand and Jack Elam.

Plot summary
Brendan O'Malley crosses the border into Mexico to escape justice for a murder, pursued by Sheriff Dana Stribling. He arrives at the ranch of a former lover, Belle Breckenridge. Brendan is determined to win back Belle.

O'Malley meets her daughter Melissa. He is immediately attracted to Missy, who reminds him of Belle when they were lovers years ago. The next day they are joined by the well-mannered Virginian drunkard John Breckenridge, Belle's husband. He hires O'Malley to drive his herd to Crazy Horse, Texas. O'Malley accepts under condition he is paid with one fifth of the herd, but also tells Breckenridge he will take his wife once the cattle drive is finished. Breckenridge doesn't take him seriously.

Stribling arrives at the ranch to serve a warrant for the murder. He does not have jurisdiction to arrest O'Malley in Mexico so he also agrees to join the cattle drive to Texas. He promises to deliver O'Malley to the law upon their arrival.

During the cattle drive Breckenridge separates and goes to a bar where he gets drunk. Two former Confederates confront Breckenridge and accuse him of cowardice during a battle in the Civil War. Although Stribling and O'Malley team up to try and save Breckenridge's life, Breckinridge is shot in the back and killed trying to leave the bar. Stribling and O'Malley respond by shooting the man who shot Breckinridge, and then bury Breckinridge back at the cattle drive camp.

Along the journey, Stribling and Belle become attracted to each other and plan to marry. O'Malley is crushed when he sees them and eventually falls in love with Missy, who convinces him she's not too young for him. O’Malley also finds out that the man he murdered was Stribling's brother-in-law and that his sister hanged herself after the death of her husband.

The group manages to get safely to Texas where Belle begs Stribling not to confront O’Malley. He has mixed feelings but doesn't want to back down. On the eve of the showdown between the two men, Belle discloses the secret that Missy is the daughter of O'Malley and their incestuous love cannot continue. He is stunned but refuses to believe her. He spends the day with Missy and promises to leave with her. O'Malley then leaves for the gunfight, where he is gunned down by Stribling. Upon looking at O'Malley's gun, Stribling realizes that the pistol was unloaded, and that O'Malley had effectively committed suicide.

Cast
Rock Hudson as Dana Stribling
Kirk Douglas as Brendan "Bren" O'Malley
Dorothy Malone as Belle Breckenridge
Joseph Cotten as John Breckenridge
Carol Lynley as Melissa "Missy" Breckenridge
Neville Brand as Frank Hobbs
Regis Toomey as Milton Wing
Rad Fulton as Julesburg Kid
Adam Williams as Calverton
Jack Elam as Ed Hobbs
John Shay as Bowman

Production
In 1959 Kirk Douglas announced he had bought the rights to Day of the Gun by Richard Telfair (the pen name for Richard Jessup).

In December 1959 it was announced Douglas and Rock Hudson would star in Day of the Gun from the novel by Howard Vechel, filming to begin in Aguascalientes, Mexico, in March. It was the ninth film from Bryna, Douglas' production company.

In May 1960 it was announced that Dalton Trumbo was on set working on the script. Trumbo had previously written Spartacus for Douglas's company and Universal. At this stage Universal had not decided if Trumbo would get screen credit for his work on Spartacus. However United Artists had said they would give Trumbo credit for his work on Exodus.

Douglas wanted Sandra Dee to play a key support role. Then Tuesday Weld was cast but was unable to do it due to delays on High Time so Carol Lynley played the role.

Douglas hired Robert Aldrich to direct. Aldrich later said he was "dead broke" at the time, after having made "two bad pictures" in Europe and spent months on an unsuccessful attempt to make a film of Taras Bulba. Aldrich says the film was a "very unpleasant experience". He says Dalton Trumbo had written a script but left the project to go and work on Exodus for Otto Preminger. He did return to Last Sunset, but Aldrich says "it was too late to save it" by then. Aldrich says "Kirk was impossible. He knew the screenplay wasn't right. The whole thing started badly, went on badly, ended badly. Rock Hudson of all people emerged from it more creditably than anyone. Most people don't consider him a very accomplished actor but I found him terribly hardworking and dedicated and very serious... if everybody on that picture, from producer to writer to other actors, had approached it with the same dedication it would have been a lot better."

During filming the movie was known as The Day of the Gun, Journey Into Sunset and The Hot Eye of Heaven.

"That was a toughie", said Aldrich. "I found it extremely difficult personally to do the film. But in this business you have to stay alive. You have to take subjects like this to make money to eat, to buy more properties and float another project."

Aldrich admitted part of his problem with Douglas was Douglas discovered Aldrich had three writers, including Lukas Heller, staying with him during filming to work on other projects. This upset Douglas, who felt Aldrich should be concentrating on The Last Sunset. "He went berserk", said Aldrich. "He just went crazy." Aldrich sent his writers away to Mexico City.

See also
 List of American films of 1961

References

External links
 
 
 
 

1961 films
Films directed by Robert Aldrich
Universal Pictures films
1961 Western (genre) films
Films with screenplays by Dalton Trumbo
Films scored by Ernest Gold
Films based on American novels
Films based on Western (genre) novels
American Western (genre) films
Incest in film
Bryna Productions films
1960s English-language films
Estudios Churubusco films
Films shot in Mexico
1960s American films